The Ahvaz National Resistance is an ethnic Arab opposition movement in Iran that seeks an independent state in Khuzestan Province. 

Described by Israeli newspaper Haaretz as "an umbrella organization of all armed movements", the Ahvaz National Resistance claimed responsibility for the 2018 Ahvaz military parade attack. The Islamic State of Iraq and the Levant later also claimed responsibility. Speaking to Iran International TV in London, Yaqoub al-Tostari,  for one of the two groups that identify themselves as the Arab Struggle Movement for the Liberation of Ahvaz, said the Ahvaz National Resistance was behind the attack, which killed 25 people excluding the five assailants, but did not specify which group.

On 23 September 2018, Danish broadcaster DR stated that al-Tostari lives in Denmark and had an interview with him, explaining a day later that the name "Yaqoub al-Tostari" is a cover, and that his real name is known to the broadcaster.

See also
Arab separatism in Khuzestan
National Liberation Movement of Ahwaz
Arab Struggle Movement for the Liberation of Ahwaz

References
Footnotes

Notes

National liberation movements
Arab nationalist militant groups
Arab nationalism in Iran
Terrorism in Iran
Militant opposition to the Islamic Republic of Iran
Khuzestan conflict